When the Soldiers (German: Wenn die Soldaten) is a 1931 German comedy film directed by Jacob Fleck and Luise Fleck and starring Otto Wallburg, Gretl Theimer and Ida Wüst.

Cast

References

Bibliography
 Alfred Krautz. International directory of cinematographers, set- and costume designers in film, Volume 4. Saur, 1984.

External links

1931 films
Films of the Weimar Republic
1931 comedy films
German comedy films
1930s German-language films
Films directed by Luise Fleck
Films directed by Jacob Fleck
Military humor in film
German black-and-white films
1930s German films